Doug Applegate may refer to:

 Douglas Applegate (1928–2021), American politician, member of the U.S. House of Representatives from Ohio
 Doug Applegate (California politician), retired Marine from San Diego County who ran for Congress